Events from the year 1864 in Germany.

Incumbents
 King of Bavaria – Maximilian II of Bavaria; Ludwig II of Bavaria
 King of Prussia – William I
 King of Saxony – John

Events
 1 February – Beginning of Second Schleswig War
 2 February – Battle of Mysunde
 6 February – Battle of Sankelmark
 17 March – Battle of Jasmund
 7–18 April – Battle of Dybbøl
 25 April – 25 June – London Conference of 1864
 9 May – Battle of Heligoland
 29 June – 1 July – Battle of Als
 3 July – Battle of Lundby
 30 October – Treaty of Vienna, End of Second Schleswig War

Undated
 Evacuation of Danevirke
 Alfred Enneper publishes his parametrization of the Enneper surface in connection with minimal surface theory
 Hugo Erfurt invents Ingrain wallpaper

Births
 8 January – Julie Wolfthorn, German painter (died 1944)
 13 January – Wilhelm Wien, German physicist, Nobel Prize laureate (died 1928)
 5 February – Carl Teike, German composer (died 1922)
 16 February – Hermann Stehr, German novelist and writer (died 1940)
 24 February – Alfred Jeremias, German pastor, assyriologist and an expert on the religions of the Ancient Near East (died 1935)
 4 March – Johanna Ey, German art dealer (died 1944)
 30 March – Franz Oppenheimer, German sociologist (died 1943)
 11 April – Johanna Elberskirchen, German writer and women rights activist (died 1943)
 21 April – Max Weber, German sociologist (died 1920)
 5 May – Hans Gerhard Gräf, German Goethe specialist (died 1942)
 12 May – Cäsar Flaischlen, German poet (died 1920)
 15 May – Robert Schmidt, German politician (died 1943)
 21 May – Otfried Nippold, German jurist (died 1938)
 22 May – Willy Stöwer, German artist and painter (died 1931)
 2 June – Wilhelm Souchon, German admiral (died 1946)
 3 June – Albert Fraenkel, German physician (died 1938)
 11 June – Richard Strauss, German composer (died 1949)
 14 June – Alois Alzheimer, German psychiatrist, neuropathologist (died 1915)
 16 June – Willy Wolterstorff, German paleontologist and herpetologist (died 1943)
 22 June – Hermann Minkowski, German mathematician (died 1909), born in Russia
 25 June – Walther Nernst, German chemist, Nobel Prize laureate (died 1941)
 18 July – Ricarda Huch, German historian and writer (died 1947)
 24 July – Frank Wedekind, German playwright (died 1918)
 12 August – Kuno von Westarp, German politician (died 1945)
 17 August – Paul Wendland, German philologist (died 1915)
 20 August – Karl Fritz, German Roman Catholic archbishop (died 1931)
 27 August – Hermann Weingärtner, German gymnast (died 1919)
 19 September – Carl Correns, German biologist (died 1933)
 26 September – Arthur Kampf, German painter (died 1950)
 5 October – Arthur Zimmermann, German diplomat (died 1945)
 30 October – Theodor Wiegand, German archaeologist (died 1936)
 27 November – Alfred Meyer-Waldeck, German admiral (died 1928), born in Russia
 31 December – Hans am Ende, German painter (died 1918)

Deaths
 27 January – Leo von Klenze, German neoclassicist architect, painter and writer (born 1784)
 10 March – Maximilian II of Bavaria, German king of Bavaria (born 1811)
 2 May – Giacomo Meyerbeer, German composer (born 1791), died in France
 3 August – Jakob Walter, German stonemason, common draftee (born 1788)

References 

 
Years of the 19th century in Germany
Germany
Germany
1860s in Germany